Ginifer may refer to:

 Ginifer railway station, in Melbourne, Australia
 Jack Ginifer (1927–1982), Australian politician